John Graves is an American former racing driver from Miami, Florida.

He won the 1977 24 Hours of Daytona teaming with owner-driver Dave Helmick and Porsche factory driver Hurley Haywood in a two-year-old Porsche Carrera RSR entered as "Ecurie Escargot". Graves drove in a number of other high-profile sports car races of the era including the 12 Hours of Sebring, usually teaming with Helmick.

References

Racing drivers from Miami
Living people
24 Hours of Daytona drivers
Year of birth missing (living people)